Magdalena, officially the Municipality of Magdalena, is a 4th class municipality in the province of Laguna, Philippines. According to the 2020 census, it has a population of 27,816 people.

History
Magdalena was formerly a barrio of Majayjay, Laguna. A petition from the residents of the barrio for the creation of a new town was presented on September 15, 1819. It was proclaimed a new town by Governor General Don Mariano Fernández de Folgueras on January 18, 1820, and was originally named "Magdalena de Ambling". The name was derived from its patron saint Maria Magdalena and the barrio of Ambling where it was established. The first Teniente Alcalde or Capitan (the highest political authority in a town) was Don Mauricio San Mateo.

They first established a makeshift school in 1820, which was the very first requirement for it to be a town. The municipal hall was also constructed. A small chapel was also constructed and it gave way to the construction of a church in 1829. The church was made of stones and bricks and donations were solicited from the residents. The construction was finished in 1861. The construction of the concrete town hall and the church convent started in 1871 and was finished in 1884.

The revolt against the Spaniards in this area started on November 13, 1896, when the male residents joined the revolutionaries from the province to form a bigger force. It was during one of the encounters that Emilio Jacinto was wounded and sought refuge at the Catholic Church.

Emilio Aguinaldo, then, proclaimed the first Philippine Republic and the Spaniards finally surrendered on September 1, 1898, and celebrations followed.

The arrival of the Americans, at the turn of the century, witnessed the evacuation of the townsfolk to the mountains for fear of being killed, later returned to the Poblacion seeing that the foreigners were well-intentioned.

The Americans enforced a new system of government. Election of government officials was conducted regularly. The first elected President Municipal was Don Victor Crisostomo. It was during this time that rebels, called tulisan, formed a force to oppose the foreign rule. They robbed the house of the residents. This made the Americans very strict on the social life of the people, prohibiting them from leaving the Poblacion and talking to each other publicly. It was on June 15, 1929, that electricity was introduced in the municipality. Life continued under the American regime and to an extent, introduced their own culture to the Filipinos until the Second World War broke out in 1941.

In 1945, Filipino troops of the 4th, 42nd, 43rd, 45th and 46th Infantry Division of the Philippine Commonwealth Army and 4th Constabulary Regiment of the Philippine Constabulary liberated the towns in Magdalena, Laguna. The Japanese surrendered to the Filipino soldiers and guerrillas on May 25, 1945, thus, Magdalena, as well as the Philippines, was liberated from the Japanese army. After the war, they returned to the Poblacion and started their lives from what was left of the war.

Post-World War II, Magdalena became a preferred shooting location for numerous films, including The Ravagers (also known as Only the Brave Know Hell).

Geography

Barangays
Magdalena is politically subdivided into 24 barangays.

Alipit
Malaking Ambling
Munting Ambling
Baanan
Balanac
Bucal
Buenavista
Bungkol
Buo
Burlungan
Cigaras
Ibabang Atingay
Ibabang Butnong
Ilayang Atingay
Ilayang Butnong
Ilog
Malinao
Maravilla
Poblacion
Sabang
Salasad
Tanawan
Tipunan
Halayhayin

Climate

Demographics

Economy

Government

Elected officials

Municipal council, 2022-2025

Municipal council, 2019-2022
 Representatives : Hon. Benjamin Agarao, Jr.
 Mayor : David Aventurado
 Vice-Mayor : Pedro Bucal
 Councilors :
 Leovio Porcioncula
 Larry Ibañez
 Mj Palomique
 Romel Lerum
 Ariel Ungco
 Ron Zaguirre
 Mary Grace Reodica
 Max Sotomayor

Tourism

 

Some notable tourist attractions include:
St. Mary Magdalene Parish Church
Mali-Mali Bridge
Emilio Jacinto Shrine
The Rizal Park
The Bahay Laguna
The Pintong Kabag
The Pintong Pilak
Magdalena White Water River Rafting Adventure
Vonwelt Nature Farm

The Kawayan Festival
Magdalena recently held its first Kawayan Festival to mark the town's 185th Foundation Day. The colorful festival celebrates the native bamboo and its role in the culture and livelihood of the town and to promote bamboo-based industries.

Liga ng mga Barangay national president James Marty Lim was special guest at the festival, and together with Magdalena town officials led by Mayor David Aventurado Jr., congratulated the Magdaleños for their initiatives to promote the local bamboo industry.

However, no such bamboo enterprise visibly exists in the town.

St. Mary Magdalene Parish
St. Mary Magdalene Church was constructed in 1851–1871, and made of stones and bricks with a sandstone facade. The church is located at the town center or plaza, just across the municipal town hall of Magdalena. In February 1898, after being wounded in a battle with the Spaniards at the Maimpis River, Philippine revolutionary hero Emilio Jacinto sought refuge in this church. His bloodstains were found on the floor of the church. Magdalena is Also called "Little Hollywood Of Laguna" because it is the home of approximately 100 films.

The Bahay Laguna
Bahay Laguna is a museum in Barangay Bungkol, Magdalena, that houses the memorabilia of Governor Felicisimo T. San Luis, who served as Governor of Laguna province for 33 years. During his time, he was known as the "Living Legend of Laguna." Aside from the memorabilia of then governor, Bahay Laguna showcases the specialty crafts and signature products of Laguna towns such as woodcarving of Paete and bottled preserved fruits of Alaminos.

The construction of Bahay Laguna was finished in December 1995. The Dr. Floro Brosas Foundation donated a piece of its land for this repository.

Education

Elementary
Public:
Ananias Laico Memorial Elementary School- ALMES(formerly Magdalena Elementary School)
Ricardo A. Pronove Elementary School- RPES
Buenavista-Cigaras Elementary School-BCES
Maravilla Elementary School-MES(Formerly Maravilla Primary School)
Bungkol Elementary School-BuES
Balanac Elementary School-BaES

Secondary

Public:
Buenavista Integrated National High School-(BINHS)
Magdalena National High School - (MNHS)Formerly BNHS- Annex

Private:
Banahaw Institute-BI

College and Vocational
AMG Skilled Hands Technological College
Alternative Learning System-Magdalena
Laguna State Polytechnic University- MAGDALENA Satellite Campus

Infrastructure

Magdalena Water System
Potable water should be accessible to all. Working under this belief, the Municipality of Magdalena successfully implemented the LGU Urban Water Supply and Sanitation Project (LGU-UWSSP) in their locality.

In years past, the municipality operated the Magdalena Waterworks, a water supply system which covered ten barangays. The main water source was the Oples Spring in the nearby town of Liliw, Laguna, supplying a volume of four liters/second to 1,097 service connections. Tariff was Php 8.00 for the first 10 cubic meters and an additional Php 1.00 in excess of 10 cubic meters.

However, the people were not keen on increasing the tariff, as the service was extremely poor. Believing that water is one of the basic services that the government should be able to provide to the people, the LGU consequently searched for a more permanent solution. Through the DILG and World Bank, the Local Government Unit Urban Water Supply and Sanitation Project (LGUUWSSP) was introduced to Magdalena officials. Through barangay meetings and consultations, the LGU water project and how it will help address their problems were explained to the people.

With the creation of the Municipal Water Board in August 2004, the water system was also constructed and became fully operational within a period of one year and six months. The Water Board is at present focused in the expansion of the service area to provide quality water service to the nearby barangays. Moreover, the board is continuously producing policies to help the project be a self-sufficient and profitable economic enterprise for the LGU.

With the successful implementation of the LGU-UWSSP, there have been marked improvements in the water supply and living conditions of the people in the community. All stakeholders in the municipality benefitted from the improved water system. From the previous practice of rationing water, a 24/7 supply has been established, contributing to the improved health of the citizenry.

References

External links

[ Philippine Standard Geographic Code]
Philippine Census Information
Local Governance Performance Management System

Municipalities of Laguna (province)